Véronique Jardin (born 15 September 1966) is a French former freestyle swimmer who competed in the 1984 Summer Olympics and in the 1992 Summer Olympics. She is the mother of Béryl Gastaldello.

References

1966 births
Living people
French female freestyle swimmers
Olympic swimmers of France
Swimmers at the 1984 Summer Olympics
Swimmers at the 1992 Summer Olympics
21st-century French women
20th-century French women